San Cosmo Albanese is a village and comune in the province of Cosenza in the Calabria region of southern Italy.

In the territory of the current village a tiny rural settlement called Santo Cosma, formerly dependent on the local Basilian monastery, existed prior to the arrival of Albanians. Following the collapse of Albanian resistance to the Ottoman Empire, Albanian Christians migrated to Italy and settled in the village. As a result, today the village is home to an Arbëresh community.

People
Giuseppe Serembe, writer, poet 
Terenzio Tocci, politician

References

Arbëresh settlements
Cities and towns in Calabria